Guy Goma (born 1969) is a Congolese-French business studies graduate from Brazzaville in the Republic of the Congo who was accidentally interviewed live on BBC News 24, a UK television news station, on Monday 8 May 2006. Goma was mistaken for technology expert Guy Kewney when he attended the BBC for a job interview and was brought onto a BBC special regarding the case Apple Corps v Apple Computer to provide insight on a subject he knew little about.

Goma became well known for the incident, which is noted as a memorable TV moment.

Interview 

Goma was waiting in the main reception area of the BBC Television Centre in west London to be interviewed for a job as a data support cleanser in the corporation's IT department. At the same time, Guy Kewney, a British technology expert, was in another reception area preparing for a live television interview on the subject of Apple Computer's court case with the Beatles' record label, Apple Corps. The producer sent to fetch Kewney was told that Kewney was in the main reception area. When he asked the receptionist where Guy Kewney was, she pointed to Goma, even after he asked if she was sure this was the right person.

The producer had seen a photo of Kewney, but only had five minutes before the live interview was due to take place. He approached Goma and asked him if he was "Guy". Hearing his first name, Goma answered in the affirmative. Goma was led to the News 24 studio. BBC staff put on makeup, and he was ushered to the television studio, where he was seated in front of the cameras and wired up with a microphone. Although he thought the situation was strange, he believed he was about to be interviewed for a job.

When introduced by interviewer Karen Bowerman as Internet expert Guy Kewney, Goma realised there had been a misunderstanding and was visibly shocked. Aware that he was on live television and not wishing to make a scene, Goma attempted to answer questions about the Apple Corps v Apple Computer case and its ramifications for the music industry. While not an expert, Goma knew enough about downloading and cyber cafés to make credible answers. Kewney, still in the waiting area, was shocked when he saw Goma interviewed in his place, though he was not able to hear the audio.

Transcript 
 Karen Bowerman: Well, Guy Kewney is editor of the technology website Newswireless. Hello, good morning to you.
 Goma (visibly shocked): Good morning.
 KB: Were you surprised by this verdict today?
 Goma: I am very surprised to see... this verdict to come on me, because I was not expecting that. When I came, they told me something else and I am coming. "You got an interview," that's all. So a big surprise anyway.
 KB: A big surprise, yeah, yes.
 Goma: Exactly.
 KB: With regards to the cost that's involved, do you think now more people will be downloading online?
 Goma: Actually, if you can go everywhere you're gonna see lot of people downloading through Internet and the website, everything they want. But I think is much better for development and...eh...to improve people what they want, and to get on the easy way, and so faster the things they looking for.
 KB: This does really seem to be the way the music industry's progressing now, that people want to go onto the website and download music.
 Goma: Exactly. You can go everywhere on the cyber cafe, and you can take...you can go easy. It is going to be an easy way for everyone to get something through the Internet.
 KB: Guy Kewney, thanks very much indeed.

Aftermath 
Twenty minutes after the television interview, Goma attended his job interview, which lasted ten minutes. He was not hired.

As soon as the mistake was detected, the BBC recorded an interview with Kewney for later broadcast, which was never shown. The BBC instead brought in an alternative pundit, Rupert Goodwins, for the next live slot on the topic.

Soon after his appearance, there was speculation that Goma was in Britain illegally, having overstayed a tourist visa. In fact, he had met the requirements to indefinitely live and work in the UK some three years earlier. On 25 May 2006, celebrity publicist Kizzi Nkwocha began representing Goma.

Goma and Kewney subsequently met.

Later history 
On 16 May 2006, Goma appeared on Channel 4 News and was jokingly questioned by the presenter—introducing him as a Venezuelan citizen, a lawyer and a doctor respectively—on the topics of Hugo Chávez, the release of foreign prisoners into Britain, and Britons seeking medical treatment abroad. On the same day, he also appeared again on BBC News 24, but this time in a planned interview to talk about his experience. He later appeared in a comedy skit on The Big Fat Quiz of the Year 2006. Film producer Alison Rosenzweig stated in 2006 that she had begun developing a film based on his life, particularly this one incident, commenting "He's a fun, kind of internationally famous person that I think is an interesting source for movie material." As of 2022, no such film has been produced. In 2022, Goma was interviewed on the BBC World Service's Outlook programme about his experience. 

In 2016, ten years after Goma's appearance, the incident was named as one of the BBC's most memorable interview bloopers, and some outlets noted that Goma's prediction that more people would be using the Internet to download music and other media they want was largely correct.

References

External links

Video 
 First BBC interview
 Second BBC interview
 Channel 4 interview 
 GMTV interview

Audio 
 Story from NPR All Things Considered program, 15 May 2006

1969 births
Living people
Republic of the Congo emigrants to England
People from Brazzaville
Place of birth missing (living people)
British television personalities
Internet memes introduced in 2006
BBC News